Scullion may refer to:
 The Irish surname derived from 'Ó Scolláin' meaning 'descendant of the/a scholar'
 a servant from the lower classes.

Music 
Scullion (group), an Irish folk rock band
 Scullion (album)

People with the surname
Michelle Scullion (born 1957), New Zealand musician and composer
Nigel Scullion, Australian politician
Stephen Scullion, Northern Irish runner
Tony Scullion, Irish Gaelic footballer

See also
Skullion - the main character in the novels Porterhouse Blue and Grantchester Grind